Godnje is a small settlement next to Dutovlje in the Municipality of Sežana in the Littoral region of Slovenia.

References

External links
Godnje on Geopedia

Populated places in the Municipality of Sežana